Miles Axe Copeland Jr. (July 16, 1916 – January 14, 1991) was an American musician, businessman, and Central Intelligence Agency (CIA) officer best known for his relationship with Egyptian leader Gamal Abdel Nasser and his public commentary on intelligence matters. Copeland participated in numerous covert operations, including the March 1949 Syrian coup d'état and the 1953 Iranian coup d'état.

A conservative influenced by the ideas of James Burnham, Copeland was associated with the American political magazine National Review. In a 1986 Rolling Stone interview, he stated "Unlike The New York Times, Victor Marchetti and Philip Agee, my complaint has been that the CIA isn't overthrowing enough anti-American governments or assassinating enough anti-American leaders, but I guess I'm getting old."

Background and family life
The son of a doctor, Copeland was born in Birmingham, Alabama. He did not graduate from college. According to history professor Hugh Wilford, there is nothing in Copeland's CIA files to suggest he was a professional musician, but "several relatives and friends have testified to his musical ability." Copeland's books contain "several impressive statements about his days as a jazz musician," including that "he spent a week playing fourth trumpet in the Glenn Miller orchestra," although this claim has been discredited.

Copeland was married to archaeologist Lorraine Adie. He was the father of music manager Miles Copeland III, booking agent Ian Copeland, film producer Lorraine (Lennie) Copeland, and drummer Stewart Copeland, a founding member of the rock band The Police.

Career

CIA founding
At the outbreak of World War II, Copeland joined the National Guard, and contacted Rep. John Sparkman of Alabama, who arranged a meeting with William J. Donovan. The two hit it off immediately, but Copeland nonetheless was not recruited to Donovan's Office of Strategic Services (OSS) and instead joined the Corps of Intelligence Police, which became the Counterintelligence Corps (CIC) in January 1942. Copeland was stationed in London and reportedly gained the top-secret "Bigot" clearance and took part in discussions about Operation Overlord.

After the conversion of the OSS into the Strategic Services Unit on 1 October 1945, Copeland joined what would become part of the Central Intelligence Agency (CIA). Serving in London, he became a lifelong Anglophile. He married Lorraine Adie, a Scot he had met during the war when she was serving in the Special Operations Executive.

CIA career
After the end of World War II and the creation of the CIA, Copeland was asked to organize the agency’s information-gathering unit in the Middle East. He was stationed in Damascus, Syria, as a CIA case officer under the cover title "cultural attaché," beginning a long career in the Middle East. Together with Stephen Meade (1913–2004) he played a role in supporting the March 1949 Syrian coup d'état. Working with Kim Roosevelt, he was instrumental in arranging Operation Ajax, the 1953 technical coup d'état against Prime Minister of Iran Mohammad Mosaddegh.

In 1953, Copeland returned to private life at the consulting firm Booz Allen Hamilton while remaining a non-official cover operative for the CIA. He traveled to Cairo to meet Gamal Abdel Nasser, who had overthrown King Farouk and taken power in Egypt, advising Nasser on the development of the Mukhabarat and becoming Nasser's closest Western advisor. Copeland opposed major paramilitary CIA operations such as the failed Bay of Pigs Invasion of Cuba in 1961 on the grounds that they were impossible to keep secret due to their size.

Copeland was known for his "Machiavellian sense of pessimism about human nature", which he derived in part from The Machiavellians, a book written by his "intellectual mentor", the Trotskyist-turned-conservative James Burnham. Copeland requested Burnham's "advice about ways to shore up revolutionary governments" and distilled Burnham's teachings into three key points: 1) The major priority of any government is perpetuating its rule; 2) Political leaders must remain cognizant of the irrationality of their subjects; and 3) A successful revolution requires a certain degree of political repression, although it is more advantageous if repression is kept to a minimum.

In The Game Player, Copeland recounted that he was sent to Egypt to assess the feasibility of assassinating Nasser "on the tacit understanding that he would reach a negative assessment" and thus "discourage any British attempt".
Arriving in Cairo, Miles immediately confessed his mission to Nasser, whereupon the old friends began gaming out possible assassination plots. "How about poison?" the American asked the Egyptian. "Suppose I just wait until you turn your head and then slip a pill into your coffee?" "Well, there's Hassan standing right there," replied Nasser. "If I didn't see you Hassan would." "But maybe we could bribe a servant to poison the coffee before bringing it in?" "The coffee would only kill the taster." And so the conversation carried on—at least in Miles's recollection.

Retirement
Copeland retired from the CIA in May 1957 to start the consulting firm Copeland & Eichelberger in Beirut, Lebanon, with his CIC and CIA colleague James Eichelberger; he did, however, continue to perform assignments for the Agency on request. Copeland and his family returned to London in 1970. He made regular appearances on British television as an intelligence expert and pursued work in journalism, writing books on foreign policy, an autobiography, and contributing to the conservative American magazine National Review. He helped Waddingtons design a board game, The Game of Nations, in which superpowers compete for influence in "the imaginary region of Kark"; the game was loosely based on Copeland's book of the same name. Copeland's memoirs have a strong literary quality and contain many embellishments, making it difficult to gauge the historical accuracy of the covert operations he describes. He was active in 1970s political efforts to defend the CIA against critics, including the Church Committee. In 1988, he wrote an article titled "Spooks for Bush" which asserted that the intelligence community overwhelmingly supported George H. W. Bush for president; he had named Bush his favorite CIA director.

Books
 The Game of Nations: The Amorality of Power Politics. New York: Simon and Schuster; London: Weidenfeld & Nicolson (1969).
 Without Cloak or Dagger: The Truth About the New Espionage. New York: Simon and Schuster (1974).
 Published in the United Kingdom as Real Spy World. London: Weidenfeld and Nicolson (1974).
 Beyond Cloak and Dagger: Inside the CIA. New York: Pinnacle Books (1975).
 The Game Player: Confessions of the CIA's Original Political Operative. London: Aurum Press (1989).

References

Bibliography
 Copeland, Miles, Jr. (1969)  The Game of Nations: The Amorality of Power Politics.
 Copeland, Miles, Jr. (1989). The Game Player: Confessions of the CIA's Original Political Operative. London: Aurum Press.

 Meyer, Karl E. and Shareen Blair Brysac (2009). Kingmakers: The Invention of the Modern Middle East. New York: W.W. Norton & Co. pp. 348–380. .

External links
 Miles Copeland, Jr. at IMDb

American Cold War spymasters
1916 births
1991 deaths
Military personnel from Birmingham, Alabama
Musicians from Birmingham, Alabama
American jazz trumpeters
American male trumpeters
American spies
Booz Allen Hamilton people
Cold War spies
Board game designers
20th-century American musicians
20th-century trumpeters
The Police
Copeland family
Jazz musicians from Alabama
American male jazz musicians
CIA operatives in Iran
American expatriates in Iran
American expatriates in the United Kingdom
Alabama National Guard personnel
CIA activities in the Middle East
20th-century American male musicians
People of the Office of Strategic Services